Muḥammad ibn ‘Abd Allāh ibn Ḥasan ibn Abī Numayy was Emir of Mecca and ruler of the Hejaz from 1631 to 1632, in partnership with Zayd ibn Muhsin.

He was the son of the Emir of Mecca, Sharif Abd Allah ibn Hasan. On Friday, 1 Safar 1041 AH (29 August 1631), Abd Allah abdicated and appointed Muhammad and Zayd ibn Muhsin as his successors.

Muhammad and Zayd reigned together until Sha'ban (March 1632), when Mecca was captured by a rebel Yemeni army led by the commanders Kor Mahmud and Ali Bey. The rebels allied with Nami ibn Abd al-Muttalib, a rival cousin, and marched on Mecca after they were refused permission to enter the city on their way to Egypt. Muhammad and Zayd, accompanied by Mustafa Bey, governor of Jeddah, fought the rebels and were defeated near Wadi al-Biyar on Wednesday, 25 Sha'ban (17 March 1632). Muhammad was killed along with a group of the ashraf, two hundred of his men, and most of the Ottoman garrison. The ashraf returned his body to Mecca that same day, bathed him, prayed over him, then buried him in al-Ma'lah.

After Zayd fled with the remaining ashraf to Wadi Marr al-Zahran, Nami entered Mecca with the rebels and took possession of the Emirate.

Notes

References
 
 

 
 

Sharifs of Mecca
Banu Qatadah
1632 deaths
17th-century Arabs
Burials at Jannat al-Mu'alla